Lake Helen Mackenzie is a lake on Vancouver Island at the head of Piggott Creek in Strathcona Provincial Park.

References

Alberni Valley
Helen Mackenzie
Strathcona Provincial Park
Comox Land District